TVN Turbo is a Polish TV channel aimed at men with a major focus on automotive programming, it launched on 12 December 2003. It is part of the TVN network and is owned by Warner Bros. Discovery.

TVN Turbo features programming of interest to men, including such topics as the Polish & international automotive industry, technology and sports. It broadcasts original programming as well as foreign series such as popular BBC series Top Gear and Motorvision.  Original shows include: OES - a magazine show about motorsports,  De Lux - a show about the world of luxury cars and program Jednoślad ("One-track") - a program for motorbike enthusiasts.

TVN Turbo is available via cable and satellite.

References

External links
 Official Site 

TVN (Polish TV channel)
Television channels in Poland
Television channels and stations established in 2003
2003 establishments in Poland
Polish-language television stations
Mass media in Warsaw